A ceasefire (also known as a truce or armistice), also spelled cease fire (the antonym of 'open fire'), is a temporary stoppage of a war in which each side agrees with the other to suspend aggressive actions. Ceasefires may be between state actors or involve non-state actors.

Ceasefires may be declared as part of a formal treaty, but also as part of an informal understanding between opposing forces. They may occur via mediation or otherwise as part of a peace process or be imposed by United Nations Security Council resolutions via Chapter VII of the United Nations Charter.

The immediate goal of a ceasefire is to stop violence, but the underlying purposes of ceasefires vary. Ceasefires may be intended to meet short-term limited needs (such as providing humanitarian aid), manage a conflict to make it less devastating, or advance efforts to peacefully resolve a dispute. An actor may not always intend for a ceasefire to advance the peaceful resolution of a conflict, but instead give the actor an upper hand in the conflict (for example, by re-arming and reposition forces or attacking an unsuspecting adversary), which creates bargaining problems that may make ceasefires less likely to be implemented and less likely to be durable if implemented.

The durability of ceasefire agreements is affected by several factors, such as demilitarized zones, withdrawal of troops and third-party guarantees and monitoring (e.g. peacekeeping). Ceasefire agreements are more likely to be durable when they reduce incentives to attack, reduce uncertainty about the adversary's intentions, and when mechanisms are put in place to prevent and control accidents from developing into conflict.

Overview
Ceasefire agreements are more likely to be reached when the costs of conflict are high and when the actors in a conflict have lower audience costs. Scholars emphasize that war termination is more likely to occur when actors have more information about each other, when actors can make credible commitments, and when the domestic political situation makes it possible for leaders to make war termination agreements without incurring domestic punishment.

By one estimate, there were at least 2202 ceasefires across 66 countries in 109 civil conflicts over the period 1989–2020.

Historical examples
Historically, the concept of a ceasefire existed at least by the time of the Middle Ages, when it was known as a 'truce of God'.

World War I

During World War I, on December 24, 1914, there was an unofficial ceasefire on the Western Front as France, the United Kingdom, and Germany observed Christmas. There are accounts that claimed the unofficial ceasefire took place throughout the week leading to Christmas, and that British and German troops exchanged seasonal greetings and songs between their trenches. The ceasefire was brief but spontaneous. Beginning when German soldiers lit Christmas trees, it quickly spread up and down the Western Front. One account described the development in the following words:

It was good to see the human spirit prevailed amongst all sides at the front, the sharing and fraternity. All was well until the higher echelons of command got to hear about the effect of the ceasefire, whereby their wrath ensured a return to hostilities.

There was no peace treaty signed during the Christmas truce, and the war resumed after a few days.

Karachi Agreement

The Karachi Agreement of 1949 was signed by the military representatives of India and Pakistan, supervised by the United Nations Commission for India and Pakistan, establishing a cease-fire line in Kashmir following the Indo-Pakistani War of 1947.

Korean War
On November 29, 1952, the US president-elect, Dwight D. Eisenhower, went to Korea to see how to end the Korean War. With the UN's acceptance of India's proposed armistice, the ceasefire of the Korean People's Army (KPA), the People's Volunteer Army (PVA), and the UN Command had the battle line approximately at the 38th parallel north. These parties signed the Korean Armistice Agreement on July 27, 1953, to end the fighting. South Korean President Syngman Rhee attacked the peace proceedings and did not sign the armistice. Upon agreeing to the ceasefire agreement, which called upon the governments of South Korea, North Korea, China, and the United States to participate in continued peace talks. The principal belligerents established the Korean Demilitarized Zone (DMZ), which has since been patrolled by the KPA and the joint Republic of Korea Army, US, and UN Command. The war is considered to have ended at that point even though there still is no peace treaty.

Vietnam War
On New Years Day, 1968, Pope Paul VI convinced South Vietnam and the United States to declare a 24-hour-truce. However, the Viet Cong and North Vietnam did not adhere to the truce, and ambushed the 2nd Battalion, Republic of Vietnam Marine Division, 10 minutes after midnight in Mỹ Tho. The Viet Cong would also attack a U.S. Army fire support base near Saigon, causing more casualties.

On January 15, 1973, US President Richard Nixon ordered a ceasefire of the aerial bombings in North Vietnam. The decision came after Henry Kissinger, the National Security Advisor to the President, returned to Washington, D.C., from Paris, France, with a draft peace proposal. Combat missions continued in South Vietnam. By January 27, 1973, all parties of the Vietnam War signed a ceasefire as a prelude to the Paris Peace Accord.

Gulf War
After Iraq was driven out of Kuwait by US-led coalition forces during Operation Desert Storm, Iraq and the UN Security Council signed a ceasefire agreement on March 3, 1991. Subsequently, throughout the 1990s, the U.N. Security Council passed numerous resolutions calling for Iraq to disarm its weapons of mass destruction unconditionally and immediately. Because no peace treaty was signed after the Gulf War, the war still remained in effect, including an alleged assassination attempt of former US President George H. W. Bush by Iraqi agents while on a visit to Kuwait; Iraq being bombed in June 1993 as a response, Iraqi forces firing on coalition aircraft patrolling the Iraqi no-fly zones, US President Bill Clinton's bombing of Baghdad in 1998 during Operation Desert Fox, and an earlier 1996 bombing of Iraq by the US during Operation Desert Strike. The war remained in effect until 2003, when US and UK forces invaded Iraq and toppled Saddam Hussein's regime from power.

Kashmir conflict

A UN-mediated ceasefire was agreed between India and Pakistan, on 1 January 1949, ending the Indo-Pakistani War of 1947 (also called the 1947 Kashmir War). Fighting broke out between the two newly independent countries in Kashmir in October 1947, with India intervening on behalf of the princely ruler of Kashmir, who had joined India, and Pakistan supporting the rebels. The fighting was limited to Kashmir, but, apprehensive that it might develop into a full-scale international war, India referred the matter to the UN Security Council under Article 35 of the UN Charter, which addresses situations "likely to endanger the maintenance of international peace". The Security Council set up the dedicated United Nations Commission for India and Pakistan, which mediated for an entire year as the fighting continued. After several UN resolutions outlining a procedure for resolving the dispute via a plebiscite, a ceasefire agreement was reached between the countries towards the end of December 1948, which came into effect in the New Year. The Security Council set up the United Nations Military Observer Group for India and Pakistan (UNMOGIP) to monitor the ceasefire line. India declared a ceasefire in Kashmir Valley during Ramadan in 2018.

Northern Ireland
The Irish Republican Army held several Christmas ceasefires (usually referred to as truces) during the Northern Ireland conflict.

Israeli–Palestinian conflict
An example of a ceasefire in the Israeli–Palestinian conflict was announced between Israel and the Palestinian National Authority on February 8, 2005. When announced, chief Palestinian negotiator Saeb Erekat publicly defined the ceasefire as follows: "We have agreed that today President Mahmoud Abbas will declare a full cessation of violence against Israelis anywhere and Prime Minister Ariel Sharon will declare a full cessation of violence and military activities against Palestinians anywhere."

Syrian Civil War

Several attempts have been made to broker ceasefires in the Syrian Civil War.

2020 global ceasefire 

The 2020 global ceasefire was a response to a formal appeal by United Nations Secretary-General António Manuel de Oliveira Guterres on March 23 for a global ceasefire as part of the United Nations' response to the COVID-19 coronavirus pandemic. On 24 June 2020, 170 UN Member States and Observers signed a non-binding statement in support of the appeal, rising to 172 on 25 June 2020, and on 1 July 2020, the UN Security Council passed a resolution demanding a general and immediate global cessation of hostilities for at least 90 days.

See also 
 2020 Nagorno-Karabakh ceasefire agreement
 Armistice
 Demilitarized zone
 Ekecheiria – Olympic Truce
 Korean Armistice Agreement
 Peacemaking
 Peace process
 Peace treaty

References

Further reading 

 Clayton Govinda, Nygård Håvard Mokleiv, Strand Håvard, Rustad Siri Aas, Wiehler Claudia, Sagård Tora, Landsverk Peder, Ryland Reidun, Sticher Valerie, Wink Emma, Bara Corrine. 2022. “Introducing the Civil Conflict Ceasefire Dataset.” Journal of Conflict Resolution.
 Akebo, Malin. (2016). Ceasefire Agreements and Peace Processes: A Comparative Study. Routledge.
 Colletta, Nat. (2011). "Mediating ceasefires and cessations of hostilities agreements in the framework of peace processes." In Peacemaking: From Practice to Theory. Praeger, 135–147.
 Forster, Robert A. (2019). Ceasefires. In The Palgrave Encyclopedia of Global Security Studies. Palgrave.
 Fortna, Virginia Page. (2004). Peace Time: Cease-fire Agreements and the Durability of Peace. Princeton University Press.
Williams, R., Gustafson, D., Gent, S., & Crescenzi, M. (2021). "A latent variable approach to measuring and explaining peace agreement strength." Political Science Research and Methods, 9(1), 89–105.

External links 

University of Edinburgh Ceasefires Tracker
Search for ceasefire agreements on the Peace Agreement Access Tool (PA-X), 1990-2015.
Search for ceasefire agreements in the UN Peacemaker Database
Search for women and ceasefire agreements in PA-X Women Database

Military diplomacy
 
Military strategy
Peace mechanisms